The 2015 Mid-States Football Association season was made up of 13 United States college athletic programs that competed in the Mid-States Football Association (MSFA) under the National Association of Intercollegiate Athletics (NAIA) for the 2015 college football season.  The conference is divided into two leagues, the Mideast League and the Midwest league.

A total of three of the teams qualified for the 2012 NAIA Football National Championship:  Saint Francis and  Marian from the Mideast League and Saint Xavier from the Midwest League

References

Mid-States Football Association
Mid-States Football Association